Fey is a German or Irish name found as both a given name and surname.

Persons

Surname
Barry Fey (1930–2013), American rock concert promoter
Tina Fey or Elizabeth Stamatina "Tina" Fey (born 1970), American writer, comedian and actress
Queen Goodfey, a supporting character the 2017 TV show Mysticons in which her eldest daughter Arkayna Goodfey was chosen as the new Dragon Mage.
William Fey (1942-2021), American-Papau New Guinean Roman Catholic bishop

Given name
 Fey (singer) (born María Fernanda Blásquez Gil in 1973), Latin Grammy Award-nominated Mexican pop artist

Fictional characters
 Fey Truscott-Sade, also known as Fey or Feyde, a fictional character who appeared in the Doctor Who Magazine comic strip
 Fey Sommers, a character in the television show Ugly Betty
 The Fey Family from the Ace Attorney series

Surnames of Irish origin